is a Japanese actress.

Personal life
Tsutsui graduated from Kōfu Daiichi High School in Yamanashi Prefecture. She dropped out of Aoyama Gakuin University. She later graduated from the Waseda University School of Social Sciences.

As well as acting, Tsutsui can figure skate, play the flute, and perform Japanese buyō (dance).

Biography
In 1981, while studying at Aoyama Gakuin University, she was impressed after seeing a performance of the Third Stage performing at the Waseda University Theater Study Group. In 1982, when she took the examination at the Waseda University again, she passed and joined the Third Stage where she performed her first role. She appeared subsequently in most works performed by the theatre company.

Filmography

Television
 NHK

 Tokyo Broadcasting System

 Nippon TV

 Fuji Television

 TV Asahi

 TV Tokyo

 Wowow

 Netflix

Films

Variety programmes

Advertisements

Awards

References

External links

 - 

Japanese film actresses
Japanese stage actresses
Japanese television actresses
1960 births
Living people
Actors from Yamanashi Prefecture
Waseda University alumni
20th-century Japanese actresses
21st-century Japanese actresses